Battaristis vittella, the stripe-backed moth, is a species of moth in the family Gelechiidae. It is found in North America, where it has been recorded from the eastern United States and southern Canada.

The wingspan is 8–10 mm. The forewings are cinnamon brown with grey traverse bands. Adults have been recorded on wing from February to October.

The larvae feed on the buds and cones of various Pinus species. The species overwinters in the larval stage in a tunnel within a bud or cone. Pupation takes place in spring.

References

Moths described in 1916
Battaristis